Gland railway station is a railway station in the municipality of Gland, in the Swiss canton of Vaud. It is an intermediate stop on the standard gauge Lausanne–Geneva line of Swiss Federal Railways.

Layout and connections 
Gland has two  side platforms with two tracks ( 1–2).

Services 
 the following services stop at Gland:

References

External links 
 
 

Railway stations in the canton of Vaud
Swiss Federal Railways stations